Sarafand is a village in southern Lebanon located 10 km south of Sidon overlooking the Mediterranean Sea.

Its name conserves that of the Phoenician site of Sarepta, just north of Sarafand.

History
In 1875 Victor Guérin  noted that  the village had 400 Métualis inhabitants.

In mid-April 1980 Israeli commandos, arriving by sea, raided Sarafand killing twenty Lebanese and Palestinians, mostly civilians. During the first three weeks of April the Israelis carried out similar, but smaller, raids along the coast road between Sidon and Tyre, killing thirteen people.

On 7 June 1982, on the second day of the Israeli invasion of Lebanon an IDF brigade was ambushed as it pushed through Sarafand. Two Israeli soldiers were killed and one seriously wounded.

References

Bibliography

External links
Sarafand, Localiban

Populated places in Sidon District
Shia Muslim communities in Lebanon